Carlton Ralph Sickles (June 15, 1921 – January 17, 2004) was an American lawyer and a Congressman from .

Sickles was born in Hamden, Connecticut. After graduating from Georgetown in 1943, Sickles entered the U.S. Army and served until the end of World War II. He returned home to study law and was admitted to the bar in 1948.  In addition to practicing law, Sickles taught at the Georgetown University Law School (1960–1966), and served in the Maryland House of Delegates (1955–1962). He was instrumental in the creation of the Washington Metropolitan Area Transit Authority.

In 1962 Sickles ran for the U.S. Congress as a Democrat and won. He served two terms in the House from 1963 to 1967. Sickles voted in favor of the Civil Rights Act of 1964 and the Voting Rights Act of 1965. In 1966 he ran for Governor of Maryland, but lost. In 1967 he was a delegate to Maryland's Constitutional Convention. He made an unsuccessful bid to return to Congress in 1986. Sickles died from heart problems in 2004 at his home in Bethesda and is buried in the George Washington Cemetery at Adelphi, Maryland. The Carlton R. Sickles Memorial Sky Bridge is named after him.

External links

Carlton Ralph Sickles papers at the University of Maryland libraries

References

1921 births
2004 deaths
United States Army personnel of World War II
United States Army soldiers
Georgetown University Law Center faculty
Democratic Party members of the Maryland House of Delegates
People from Bethesda, Maryland
People from Hamden, Connecticut
Democratic Party members of the United States House of Representatives from Maryland
Military personnel from Maryland
Burials in Maryland
20th-century American politicians